Jean-Marc Makusu Mundele (born 27 March 1992) is a Congolese professional footballer who plays for Saudi Arabian club Hajer. He participated in the 2014 African Nations Championship with the DR Congo.

Club career
In 2014, Mundele went on a spell with Belgium outfit Standard Liège but was loaned right away to Újpest FC for six months. He was loaned again upon his return to Algerian side MC Oran for another six months, however he didn't take license agreement from Algerian federation. Mundele then left Standard Liège and returned to Congo to join AS Vita Club on a free transfer move. In August 2018, he signed for Egyptian side Wadi Degla on a three-year contract.

In January 2018, Mundele returned to AS Vita Club, where he netted 4 goals against CS La Mancha of Congo in 2018 CAF Confederation Cup playoff round. In November 2020, he signed for Orlando Pirates on a season-long loan deal.

On 27 January 2023, Makusu joined Saudi Arabian club Hajer.

International career
Mundele has played for the DR Congo national football team.

Career statistics

International goals
Scores and results list DR Congo's goal tally first.

References

External links

1992 births
Democratic Republic of the Congo footballers
Standard Liège players
Újpest FC players
MC Oran players
AS Vita Club players
Daring Club Motema Pembe players
Wadi Degla SC players
Hajer FC players
Algerian Ligue Professionnelle 1 players
Egyptian Premier League players
Saudi First Division League players
Expatriate footballers in Belgium
Expatriate footballers in Hungary
Expatriate footballers in Egypt
Expatriate footballers in Algeria
Expatriate footballers in Morocco
Expatriate footballers in Saudi Arabia
Living people
Association football forwards
Footballers from Kinshasa
21st-century Democratic Republic of the Congo people
Democratic Republic of the Congo A' international footballers
2014 African Nations Championship players
Democratic Republic of the Congo expatriate sportspeople in Morocco
Democratic Republic of the Congo expatriate sportspeople in Egypt
Democratic Republic of the Congo expatriate sportspeople in Algeria
Democratic Republic of the Congo expatriate sportspeople in Belgium
Democratic Republic of the Congo expatriate sportspeople in South Africa
Democratic Republic of the Congo expatriate sportspeople in Saudi Arabia
Expatriate soccer players in South Africa
2016 African Nations Championship players
2022 African Nations Championship players